Kiernozia  is a village in Łowicz County, Łódź Voivodeship, in central Poland. It is the seat of the gmina (administrative district) called Gmina Kiernozia.

The village has a population of 930 and is mostly known for being the birthplace (and burial place) of Marie Walewska (née Łączyńska), one of the mistresses of Napoleon Bonaparte.

References

Kiernozia

Interesting page about community of the village Kiernozia: https://www.facebook.com/StaraGwardiaKiernozka